The Man Who Played God is a 1922 American silent drama film directed by F. Harmon Weight and written by Forrest Halsey. The film stars George Arliss, Ann Forrest, Ivan Simpson, Edward Earle, and Effie Shannon. The film was released on October 1, 1922, by United Artists. Considered to be a lost film for decades, a print of The Man Who Played God was found at Gosfilmofond in Moscow.

Plot
A famous pianist (Montgomery Royle) is engaged to a quite younger woman. An accidental explosion results in him becoming deaf but he learns to read lips quite quickly. He decides to use that skill to help random people around him. However, he sees his fiancee in a park with a different man. Montgomery is heartbroken, but after she confesses the truth to him, he helps her to be secure with the new man.

Cast 
George Arliss as Montgomery Royle
Ann Forrest as Marjory Blaine
Ivan Simpson as Battle
Edward Earle as Philip Stevens
Effie Shannon as Mildred Arden
Miriam Battista as Little Girl
Mickey Bennett as Little Boy
Mary Astor as Young Woman
Pierre Gendron as Young Man
Margaret Seddon as Old Woman
John D. Walsh as Old Man

References

External links 

 

1922 films
American silent feature films
American black-and-white films
1920s English-language films
United Artists films
Silent American drama films
1922 drama films
1920s rediscovered films
Rediscovered American films
1920s American films